The eastern elliptio (Elliptio complanata)  is a freshwater mussel in the Unionidae family, native to Canada and the United States. It is a bivalve member of the Phylum Mollusca. Not only is it found in Canada and the United States, but it is frequently the most abundant species of mussel found in its home waterways. It is the most common mussel in the Delaware River  and the most common mussel found in the state of New Hampshire and Vermont. It can be found in the substrate at the bottom of lakes, ponds and rivers. Size is variable, but can reach up to 13 cm in length.

Reproduction 
The eastern elliptio reproduces sexually via spawning from third week of April to second week of June.

Life Cycle 
Like most Unionidae, the Elliptio complanata begins as an egg within the gills of the female elliptio, matures into a glochidia, attaching to a host fish species and then becomes a juvenile mussel. Elliptio complanata is known to attach to several fish species including American eel Anguilla rostrata, brook trout Salvelinus fontinalis, lake trout Salvelinus namaycush, mottled sculpin Cottus bairdii, and slimy sculpin Cottus cognatus. It has the most success incubating on the American eel.

References

External links

Elliptio
Molluscs described in 1786